Aahan (Ààhàn) is a divergent Volta–Niger language of Nigeria, closely related only to Ayere.

Distribution
According to Ethnologue, Ahan is spoken in:
Ekiti state: Ekiti East LGA, Omuo town
Kogi state: Ijumu LGA
Ondo state: Akoko North West LGA, Ajowa, and Igashi towns

Phonology
The phonemic inventory of Ahan is:

Consonants

Vowels

References

Ayere–Ahan languages
Languages of Nigeria